Guayanés River may refer to:

 Guayanés River (Peñuelas, Puerto Rico)
 Guayanés River (Yabucoa, Puerto Rico)

See also 
 Guyana (disambiguation)